The Journal of the European Ceramic Society is a monthly peer-reviewed scientific journal published by Elsevier on behalf of the European Ceramic Society. It covers research related to conventional categories of ceramic: structural, functional, traditional or composite. It was established in 1985 as the International Journal of High Technology Ceramics, obtaining its current name in 1989.

Abstracting and indexing
This journal is abstracted and indexed in:

According to the Journal Citation Reports, the journal has a 2020 impact factor of 5.302.

References

External links

Materials science journals
English-language journals
Elsevier academic journals
Publications established in 1985
Monthly journals